The Holy or the Broken: Leonard Cohen, Jeff Buckley & the Unlikely Ascent of 'Hallelujah is a 2012 non-fiction book written by Alan Light.

Overview
A look into the enduring popularity of the Leonard Cohen song "Hallelujah" and Jeff Buckley's cover version of it.

The book is the basis for the 2022 biographical documentary film Hallelujah: Leonard Cohen, A Journey, A Song created by Dan Geller and Dayna Goldfine. Light served as a consulting producer for the film.

References

External links
Simon & Schuster

2012 non-fiction books
English-language books
Leonard Cohen
Atria Publishing Group books